The Abbot of Westminster was the head (abbot) of Westminster Abbey.

List

Notes

References
Tudorplace.com.ar

Westminster
Abbots